Anchil Oral Arjunan is a 2007 Indian Malayalam-language family drama film directed by Anil and starring Jayaram, Padmapriya, Samvrutha, Jagathy Sreekumar, Sreenivasan, Madhu Warrier, Siddique and Venu Nagavally. The film was a box office failure.

Plot 
Sudheendran "Sudhi" works as a class tutor and theatrical actor and Kovilakam Sreedharan is his benefactor. Sudhi falls in love with Pavithra. When Sudhi reconnects with his childhood friend Sathi, Pavithra gets mad at Sudhi. More problems ensue after his cousins Vijayan and Vinayan want to take his family house. How Sudhi solves his problems forms the rest of the plot.

Cast 
Jayaram as Sudheendran a.k.a. Sudhi
Padmapriya as Pavithra
Samvrutha as Sathi
Jagathy Sreekumar as Paul
Sreenivasan as Kovilakam Sreedharan
Madhu Warrier as Vinayan
Siddique as Vijayan
Venu Nagavally as Padmanabhan
Kalpana as Shantha
Kaviyoor Ponnamma as Sudheendran's mother
K. P. A. C. Lalitha as Vijayan's mother

Release and reception 
The film was ready for release in January 2007. A critic from Sify opined that "More bad news for Jayaram fans. His films are getting from bad to worse. They have the same hackneyed storyline, scenes and look the same with nothing new in it. And to put it mildly, Jayaram should stop getting saddled with such asinine and dumb roles". C. Parashuram from Webindia 123 wrote that ""Anchil Oraal Arjunan" is strictly for hardcore Jayaram fans". A critic from Indiaglitz called the film absorbing and not entertaining. Unni Nair of Nowrunning gave a mixed review and wrote that "But the subject chosen doesn't seem to have anything new and is like old wine in a new bottle.".

References

External links 
 

Indian family films